The 22 Under 22 team (stylised as 22under22) is an honorary representative Australian rules football team created by the AFL Players' Association that seeks to recognise the best young talent in the Australian Football League (AFL) and AFL Women's (AFLW) competitions each year.  To be eligible for selection, players must be aged 22 or under for the entire season (including finals). An initial squad of 40 is selected by the AFL Players' Board, before fans select a final team of 22 by voting via social media.

Selection process
The 22 Under 22 team is the only AFL award decided by fans. Supporters were asked to pick their best teams via Facebook, or vote for individual players via Twitter.

The concept proved to be popular amongst AFL players, with many high-profile footballers voting and sharing their teams on social media. Current stars Gary Ablett, Drew Petrie, Brad Sewell, Luke Ball, Andrew Swallow and Isaac Smith all selected sides, as did former players Cameron Mooney, Daniel Harford and Warwick Capper.

Several AFL journalists, including Mick Warner and Warwick Green, also voted and shared their teams.

AFL teams

2012
In the lead-up to the first 22 Under 22 team being announced, the AFL Players' Association selected a retrospective side from the 2012 season. Adelaide's Patrick Dangerfield was named captain, while young stars Trent Cotchin, Dayne Beams and Nic Naitanui were amongst those selected.

2013
The inaugural 22 Under 22 team was announced at the 2013 "Be the Influence" AFL Players' MVP Awards on 10 September. Essendon midfielder Dyson Heppell was named as the side's captain, with North Melbourne's Jack Ziebell selected as the vice-captain.

Gold Coast had the most players selected of any club, with five Suns being picked in the final team – Jaeger O'Meara, Dion Prestia, Rory Thompson, Tom Nicholls and Trent McKenzie.

Rather than being awarded a medal or trophy, each player selected was presented with a New Era 22 Under 22 cap, designed by former North Melbourne player Daniel Pratt.

2014
The 2014 22 Under 22 team was announced at the 2014 AFL Players Association awards on 9 September.  midfielder Dyson Heppell was named as the side's captain for the second year in a row, with  forward Jack Gunston selected as the vice-captain.

 had the most players represented in the side, for the second year in a row, with six representatives – Harley Bennell, Kade Kolodjashnij, Steven May, Trent McKenzie,  Dion Prestia, and David Swallow.

2015
The 2015 22 Under 22 team was announced at the 2015 AFL Players Association awards on 15 September.  forward Jake Stringer was named as the side's captain, with  midfielder Luke Parker selected as the vice-captain.

 had the most players represented in the side, with four selections – Jeremy Cameron, Dylan Shiel, Devon Smith, and Adam Treloar.

2016
The 2016 22 Under 22 team was announced on 13 September.  midfielder Marcus Bontempelli was named as the side's captain, with  midfielder Zach Merrett selected as the vice-captain.

2017
The 2017 22 Under 22 team was announced on 12 September.  midfielder Marcus Bontempelli was named as the side's captain for the second consecutive season, with  midfielder Zach Merrett selected as the vice-captain also for the second consecutive season.

2018
The 2018 22 Under 22 team was announced on 30 August.  midfielder Marcus Bontempelli was named as the side's captain for the third consecutive season, with  midfielder Clayton Oliver selected as the vice-captain.

2019
The 2019 22 Under 22 team was announced on 29 August.  key defender Harris Andrews was named as the side's captain, with  midfielder Josh Dunkley selected as the vice-captain.

2020
The 2020 22 Under 22 team was announced on 22 September.  midfielder Andrew McGrath was named as the side's captain, with  key defender Jacob Weitering selected as the vice-captain.

2021
The 2021 22 Under 22 team was announced on 26 August.  midfielder Sam Walsh was named as the side's captain, with  midfielder Andrew Brayshaw selected as the vice-captain.

2022
The 2022 22 Under 22 team was announced on 23 August.  midfielder Andrew Brayshaw was named as the side's captain, with  midfielder Sam Walsh selected as the vice-captain.

AFLW teams

2017–2019
No AFLW 22 Under 22 teams were awarded in the 2017 to 2019 seasons. On March 24 the AFLPA announced a retrospective team covering those three seasons.

2020
The 2020 AFLW 22 Under 22 team was announced on 20 April.  defender Chloe Molloy was named as the side's captain, with  midfielder Madison Prespakis selected as the vice-captain.

2021
The 2021 AFLW 22 Under 22 team was announced on 20 April.  defender Chloe Molloy was named as the side's captain for the second consecutive year, with  midfielder Madison Prespakis once more selected as the vice-captain.

2022
The 2022 AFLW 22 Under 22 team was announced on 29 March.  midfielder Monique Conti was named as the side's captain, with  midfielder Madison Prespakis once more selected as the vice-captain.

S7 (2022)
The season seven AFLW 22 Under 22 team was announced on 22 November.  midfielder Monique Conti and   midfielder Madison Prespakis were once again named as the side's captain and vice-captain.

References

Australian rules football awards
Awards established in 2013
2013 establishments in Australia